Lupinus benthamii is a species of lupine known by the common name spider lupine.

Distribution
The plant is endemic to central California, where it is known from the Central Coast Ranges across the Central Valley into the Sierra Nevada foothills. It is common in some areas, covering hillsides with its blue blooms in the spring.

Description
They are narrow and linear in shape, just a few millimeters wide.

The flower is between 1 and 2 centimeters long and bright to deep blue in color, generally with a white or pink spot on the banner, or upper petal.

References

External links

Jepson Manual Treatment for Lupinus benthamii
Lupinus benthamii — UC Photo gallery

benthamii
Endemic flora of California
Flora of the Sierra Nevada (United States)
Natural history of the California chaparral and woodlands
Natural history of the California Coast Ranges
Natural history of the Central Valley (California)
Taxa named by Amos Arthur Heller
Plants described in 1830
Flora without expected TNC conservation status